The Boston Ski and Sports Club (usually abbreviated BSSC), a for-profit organization, was founded in 1967 in Boston, Massachusetts to provide sports leagues, social events, ski/snowboard programs, and global travel for over 30,000 active professionals in the Greater Boston area.

The Boston Ski and Sports Club were founded as the first chapter of the United States Ski and Sports Clubs. Additional chapters in New York, Rhode Island, and Connecticut were later established. Today Boston Ski and Sports Club is the only remaining club.

The BSSC claims to offer over 1000 events a year covering social and cultural activities, one-day outings, weekend trips, and adventure travels.

Membership
You do not have to be a member to participate in activities, but members receive membership rates - a savings of $5 to $40 depending on the activity.  You save $25 each time you play in a sports league, and $30 on every weekend getaway. Membership is $65 a year and $110 for a 2-year membership; corporate memberships are available. In addition to member rates on activities, members also receive the BSSC Playbook, a monthly online activity guide, and discounts at select fitness centers, area services, and other retail establishments.

Sports Leagues Offered
Basketball(indoor and outdoor)
Dodgeball
Field Hockey
Floor Hockey(indoor and outdoor)
American football (flag, both indoor and outdoor)
Golf
Kickball
Lacrosse (indoor and outdoor)
Soccer (indoor and outdoor)
Softball (indoor and outdoor)
Tennis
Ultimate Frisbee
Volleyball (indoor and outdoor)

External links
Boston Ski and Sports Club website

References

1967 establishments in Massachusetts
Clubs and societies in Massachusetts
Sports clubs established in 1967
Sports in Boston
Multi-sport clubs in the United States